The 1959 Western North Carolina 500 was a NASCAR Grand National Series event that was held on August 16, 1959, at Asheville-Weaverville Speedway in Weaverville, North Carolina. This event took place after the 1959 Nashville 300; which was set at Nashville Speedway (now Fairgrounds Speedway) in Nashville, Tennessee.

From 1949 to 1972, Richard and Lee Petty were the most dominant drivers on any circuit in NASCAR. David Pearson was easily the third most dominant NASCAR driver. Buck Baker and Rex White were considered to be the middle-of-the road competitors in NASCAR from 1949 to 1972. Fonty and Tim Flock along with Herb Thomas, Joe Weatherly, Ned Jarrett, and Bobby Isaac were considered to be below-average performers during the early years of NASCAR.

The race car drivers still had to commute to the races using the same stock cars that competed in a typical weekend's race through a policy of homologation (and under their own power). This policy was in effect until roughly 1975. By 1980, NASCAR had completely stopped tracking the year model of all the vehicles and most teams did not take stock cars to the track under their own power any more.

Race report
There were 42 American-born drivers who competed at this event; all of them were Caucasian males since Wendell Scott didn't make his introduction into NASCAR until the next decade. There were 500 laps on this race that took almost three and a half hours to resolve. Brownie King was the last-place finisher in this race due to trouble with his fan belt on lap 44.

A lot of engine problems emerged within the first 100 laps in addition to faulty spindles, decaying axles, and one crash involving Richard Petty on the 281st lap. Welborn would go winless after this race until he retired after the running of the 1964 Pennsylvania 200 in New Oxford, Pennsylvania.

A lot of Chevrolets, Thunderbirds, and Ford vehicles participated in this race. These vehicles were considered to be the quintessential vehicles own during the late 1950s and early 1960s. The only problems with fuel occurred when G.C. Spencer ran out of gas on lap 463. Bill Scott and Dominic Persicketti were the typical example of maverick stock car drivers who drove during the days when it was affordable for the daring to go without a sponsor. All the inside starters were hardtops while all the outside starters were convertibles.

Benny Rakestraw would make his grand exit from top-level NASCAR racing after this event while Chuck Tombs and Layman Utsman would make their introductions here.

Notable crew chiefs for this race were Shorty Johns, Mario Rossi and Jess Potter. Potter was also the owner of Brownie King's vehicle while Rossi took care of Tom Pistone's vehicle while in the pits. Shorty Johns was also listed as the owner of Bobby Johns' vehicle.

Qualifying

Finishing order
Section reference: 

 Bob Welborn
 Lee Petty
 Jack Smith
 Joe Lee Johnson
 Rex White
 Larry Frank
 Cotton Owens
 Buck Baker
 Marvin Porter
 Bobby Johns
 Bob Duell
 G.C. Spencer
 Shep Langdon
 Tiny Lund
 L.D. Austin
 George Green
 Ned Jarrett
 Dominic Persicketti
 George Alsobrook
 Benny Rakestraw
 Herman Berman
 Roy Tyner
 Elmo Langley
 Harlan Richardson
 Whitey Norman
 Richard Petty
 Bud Crothers
 Glen Wood
 Dave White
 Earl Balmer
 Tommy Irwin
 Gene White
 Neil Castles
 Tom Pistone
 Banjo Matthews
 Fred Harb
 Speedy Thompson
 Bill Scott
 Freddy Fryar
 Joe Weatherly
 Brownie King

References

Western North Carolina 500
Western North Carolina 500
NASCAR races at Asheville-Weaverville Speedway